Pope Celestine III (c. 1106 – 8 January 1198), was the head of the Catholic Church and ruler of the Papal States from 30 March or 10 April 1191 to his death in 1198. He had a tense relationship with several monarchs, including Emperor Henry VI, King Tancred of Sicily, and King Alfonso IX of León.

Early career
Giacinto Bobone was born into the noble Orsini family in Rome. He was appointed as cardinal-deacon in 1144 by Celestine II or Lucius II. Considered by the Roman Curia as an expert on Spain, Bobone conducted two legatine missions to Spain in (1154–55) and (1172–75) as the Cardinal-Deacon of Santa Maria in Cosmedin.

Pontificate
Celestine was elected on 29/30 March 1191 and ordained a priest 13 April 1191. He crowned Emperor Henry VI on the day after his election in 1191. In 1192, Celestine recognized Tancred as king of Sicily, despite Henry VI's wife's claim. He threatened to excommunicate Henry VI for wrongfully keeping King Richard I of England imprisoned, but he could do little else since the College of cardinals were against it. He placed Pisa under an interdict, which was lifted by his successor, Innocent III in 1198. 

Celestine, in 1192, sent a cardinal-priest of St. Lorenzo, Cinthius, to Denmark to address the discord between the Danish princes. Upon Cinthius' return to Rome, Celestine issued three papal bulls;Cum Romana ecclesia, Etsi sedes debeat, Quanto magnitudinem tuam. These bulls advised the archbishop Absalon of Lund to instruct the King of Denmark to release the bishop of Schleswig. The bulls also threatened to excommunicate the offending Duke Valdemar, who had imprisoned the bishop of Schleswig, and place the kingdom of Denmark under interdict. The bishop would stay imprisoned until Pope Innocent III restarted the process in 1203.

Celestine condemned King Alfonso IX of León for his marriage to Theresa of Portugal on the grounds of consanguinity. Portugal and León were placed under interdict. Then, in 1196, he excommunicated Alfonso IX for allying with the Almohad Caliphate while making war on Castile. Following his marriage with Berengaria of Castile, Celestine excommunicated Alfonso and placed an interdict over León.

In December 1196, Celestine issued a bull acknowledging the possessions of the Teutonic Knights.

Death
Celestine would have resigned the papacy and recommended a successor (Cardinal Giovanni di San Paolo, O.S.B.) shortly before his death, but was not allowed to do so by the cardinals.

See also

List of popes
Cardinals created by Celestine III

References

Sources

External links

initial text from the 9th edition (1876) of an old encyclopedia

Popes
Italian popes
12th-century Italian cardinals
Diplomats of the Holy See
Orsini family
1100s births
1198 deaths
12th-century popes
Burials at the Archbasilica of Saint John Lateran